Jordie Bellaire is an American comic book writer and colorist who lives in Ireland and works for DC, Marvel, Valiant, and Image comic book publishers. She has colored Pretty Deadly, The Manhattan Projects, Moon Knight, The Vision, Magneto, Nowhere Men, Hawkeye, Batman, among other titles.

Bellaire is credited with starting the "Comics are for everybody" initiative to make the comic book community more inclusive and compassionate.

Colorist Appreciation Day 
Following a Tumblr post by Bellaire in early 2013, fans declared January 24 to be "Colorist Appreciation Day", in order to celebrate how much the color adds to the artwork of any given comic. In her post, an open letter titled "I'm mad as hell and I'm not going to take it any more", directed at an unnamed fan convention, she talks about how important the colorist is but how little recognition they get, saying "Colorists are the unknown amazing backup singer that makes every track awesome".

Eisner Awards
In 2014, Bellaire was nominated for an Eisner award for best cover artist for her collaboration on The Wake with Sean Murphy. In addition, she also received a nomination for Best Coloring award for her work on various titles, which she won.

References

American comics artists
Living people
Year of birth missing (living people)
Eisner Award winners for Best Coloring
Comics colorists